In mathematics the Burau representation is a representation of the braid groups, named after and originally studied by the German mathematician Werner Burau during the 1930s.  The Burau representation has two common and near-equivalent formulations, the reduced and unreduced Burau representations.

Definition 

Consider the braid group  to be the mapping class group of a disc with  marked points . The homology group  is free abelian of rank . Let  be the projection onto this invariant subspace. Then there is a covering space  corresponding to this projection map. Much like in the construction of the Alexander polynomial, consider  as a module over the group-ring of covering transformations , which is isomorphic to the ring of  Laurent polynomials . As a -module,  is free of rank .

The unreduced Burau representation has a similar definition, namely one replaces  with its (real, oriented) blow-up at the marked points. As a -module this is free of rank .

By the homology long exact sequence of a pair, the Burau representations fit into a short exact sequence

Explicit matrices 
Let  denote the standard generators of the braid group . Then the unreduced Burau representation may be given explicitly by mapping

Likewise, for  the reduced Burau representation is given by

Bowling alley interpretation 

Given a positive braid  on  strands, interpret it as a bowling alley with  intertwining lanes. Now throw a bowling ball down one of the lanes and assume that at every crossing where its path crosses over another lane, it falls down with probability  and continues along the lower lane.

Relation to the Alexander polynomial 

where  is the reduced Burau representation of the braid .

 

Faithfulness 
The first nonfaithful Burau representations were found by John A. Moody without the use of computer, using a notion of winding number or contour integration. A more conceptual understanding, due to Darren D. Long and Mark Paton interprets the linking or winding as coming from Poincaré duality in first homology relative to the basepoint of a covering space, and uses the intersection form (traditionally called Squier's Form as Craig Squier was the first to explore its properties). Bigelow moreover provides an explicit non-trivial element in the kernel as a word in the standard generators of the braid group: let

Then an element of the kernel is given by the commutator

The Burau representation for  has been known to be faithful for some time. The faithfulness of the Burau representation when  is an open problem.

Geometry 
Craig Squier showed that the Burau representation preserves a sesquilinear form.  Moreover, when the variable  is chosen to be a transcendental unit complex number near , it is a positive-definite Hermitian pairing. Thus the Burau representation of the braid group  can be thought of as a map into the unitary group U(n).

References

External links

Braid groups
Representation theory